Elvis Merzļikins (born 13 April 1994) is a Latvian professional ice hockey goaltender for the Columbus Blue Jackets of the National Hockey League (NHL). 

Merzļikins spent several years playing hockey in Switzerland for HC Lugano, and was awarded the Jacques Plante Trophy as best goaltender in the National League in both 2016 and 2018. Drafted 76th overall by the Blue Jackets in the 2014 NHL Entry Draft, Merzļikins moved to North America in 2019 and made his NHL debut that year. 

Internationally Merzļikins has represented Latvia at the junior and senior level at multiple tournaments.

Playing career

Switzerland
Merzļikins played his junior hockey in Switzerland with HC Lugano, which allowed him to play in the NL with a Swiss player license and not count as an import player.

Throughout the 2012–13 season, Merzļikins spent several games on the bench as the backup goaltender of HC Lugano. Merzļikins would eventually make his NL debut on 28 September 2013 in a 2–1 victory over Lausanne HC.

At the end of the 2013–14 season, Merzļikins was voted off as NL Media Most Improved Player and NL Youngster of the Year. Touted by the scouting services, Merzļikins as a result was selected in the third round, 76th overall, of the 2014 NHL Entry Draft by the Columbus Blue Jackets.

In the 2015–16 season, Merzļikins enjoyed a breakout year after leading the league in saves (1,484) and ranking second in SV% and fifth in wins with a 23–13–4 record in 44 contests. In the 2016 NLA playoffs, Merzļikins led Lugano to the NL final which they would eventually lose in 5 games to SC Bern. He posted a .937 save % and 2.32 goal average in 15 playoffs games. His standout season was acknowledged by claiming the Jacques Plante Trophy as the League's best goalie.

On 22 June 2016, he agreed to a three-year contract extension with Lugano, without an NHL out-clause. At the 2016 Spengler Cup, he was named to the tournament's all-star team.

In the 2017–18 season, Merzļikins captured his second Jacques Plante Trophy as the league's Goaltender of the Year after finishing fourth in wins and fifth in saver percentage with a 19–15–1 record in 40 contests.

Merzļikins returned for his sixth and last season under contract with HC Lugano in the 2018–19 campaign. He posted a 22–18–0 record with a 2.44 goals against average (GAA), .921 save percentage (SV%) and a career-high five shutouts in 43 games. He was unable to prevent Lugano being swept in the first-round of the playoffs against EV Zug.

Columbus Blue Jackets
At the conclusion of the season with Lugano, Merzļikins left Switzerland and agreed to immediately join the Columbus Blue Jackets for the remainder of their season, signing a one-year, entry-level contract, on 20 March 2019.

His NHL debut came on 5 October 2019 against the Pittsburgh Penguins. Merzļikins allowed seven goals in the game, earning the loss. He was sent down to the Cleveland Monsters of the AHL on 6 November, later making one appearance with the Monsters before returning to the Blue Jackets. Towards the end of 2019, Merzļikins was not getting many starts, as he had yet to win a game in the NHL. Due to an injury to Joonas Korpisalo on 30 December, Merzļikins started the 31 December game and earned his first NHL win against the Florida Panthers, where he allowed one goal on 37 shots and helped Columbus to a 4–1 victory. On 11 January 2020, Merzļikins recorded his first career NHL shutout in a 3–0 win over the Vegas Golden Knights.

On 23 April 2020, the Blue Jackets signed Merzļikins to a two-year contract extension.

On 21 September 2021, Merzļikins signed a five-year, $27 million contract extension with the Blue Jackets.

International play
Merzļikins participated in the 2012 World Junior Ice Hockey Championships and 2013 World Junior Ice Hockey Championships as a member of the Latvia men's national junior ice hockey team. He was selected to the national team for the 2016 World Championship, and made his debut in the opening game against Sweden in a 2–1 overtime loss. Merzļikins also played in the 2017 World Championship and in the 2018 World Championship. In the 2018 tournament, he posted a 1.50 goals against average and .940 save percentage in six contests.

Personal life
Merzļikins was born in Riga, Latvia. Merzļikins was named after Elvis Presley, of whom his father was a fan. Merzļikins speaks Latvian, English, Russian and Italian. Merzļikins and his wife have one son. Their son is named after former teammate Matīss Kivlenieks, who died in a fireworks accident on 4 July 2021, protecting Merzļikins and his family.

Career statistics

Regular season and playoffs

International

Awards and honours

References

External links
 

1994 births
Living people
Cleveland Monsters players
Columbus Blue Jackets draft picks
Columbus Blue Jackets players
HC Lugano players
Latvian ice hockey goaltenders
Latvian expatriate sportspeople in Switzerland
Ice hockey people from Riga